1967–68 was the fifty-fifth occasion on which the Lancashire Cup completion had been held.
In the final, held on Saturday 7 October at Central Park, Wigan, (historically in the county of Lancashire), St. Helens drew 2-2 with Warrington. At half time Warrington were leading St Helens by 2-0.<br/ >
The attendance at this match was 16,897, receipts were  £3,886, and the half time score 0-2.

In the replay held eight weeks later on 2 December,  St. Helens won the trophy  by beating Warrington by the score of 13-10
The replay was held at Station Road, Pendlebury, Lancashire) and the half time score was 3-3<br/ >
The attendance at the replay was only 7,577 and receipts were £2,485-0-0
This was the first of two consecutive Lancashire Cup final wins for St. Helens, and what is more, the sixth of the seven occasions on which the club will win the trophy in the successive nine years.

Background 

The total number of teams entering the competition remained the same at 14.
The same fixture format was retained, and due to the number of clubs this resulted in no bye but one “blank” or “dummy” fixture in the first round, and one bye in the second round

Competition and results

Round 1 
Involved  7 matches (with no bye but one “blank” fixture) and 14 clubs

Round 2 - Quarter-finals 
Involved 3 matches (with one bye) and 7 clubs

Round 3 – Semi-finals  
Involved 2 matches and 4 clubs

Final

Final – Replay

Teams and scorers 

 - Try = three (3) points - Goal = two (2) points - Drop goal = two (2) points

The road to success

Notes and comments 
1 * Central Park was the home ground of Wigan with a final capacity of 18,000, although the record attendance was  47,747 for Wigan v St Helens 27 March 1959
2 * Station Road was the home ground of Swinton from 1929 to 1992 and at its peak was one of the finest rugby league grounds in the country and it boasted a capacity of 60,000. The actual record attendance was for the Challenge Cup semi-final on 7 April 1951 when 44,621 watched Wigan beat Warrington 3-2

See also 
1967–68 Northern Rugby Football League season
Rugby league county cups

References

External links
Saints Heritage Society
1896–97 Northern Rugby Football Union season at wigan.rlfans.com
Hull&Proud Fixtures & Results 1896/1897
Widnes Vikings - One team, one passion Season In Review - 1896-97
The Northern Union at warringtonwolves.org

1967 in English rugby league
RFL Lancashire Cup